Ammalo peruviana is a moth of the family Erebidae first described by Walter Rothschild in 1922. It is found in Peru.

References

Moths described in 1922
Phaegopterina
Moths of South America